Fenella Humphreys (born ) is a British classical violinist.

Career and education 
She studied under Sidney Griller, Itzhak Rashkovsky, Ida Bieler and David Takeno at the Purcell School, Guildhall School of Music and Drama, and the Robert-Schumann-Hochschule in Düsseldorf.

A number of eminent composers have written works for Humphreys, including Sir Peter Maxwell Davies, Sally Beamish, Cheryl Frances-Hoad, Gordon Crosse, Adrian Sutton and Piers Hellawell. She performs standard repertoire and contemporary violin concertos including Thomas Adès's Concentric Paths, Pēteris Vasks's Vientuļais eņģelis (Lonely Angel) and Max Richter's Recomposed: Vivaldi – The Four Seasons, which she recorded in 2019 for Rubicon Classics.

Her recording of Jean Sibelius' Violin Concerto and Humoresques with the BBC National Orchestra of Wales was released in 2021. In the same year, she released sheet music of a number of her own arrangements for violin that she performed during the covid lockdown.

She plays a violin from the circle of Peter Guarneri of Venice.

Award 
In 2018, Humphreys won the BBC Music Magazine Instrumental Award for her solo CD Bach 2 the Future, vol.II.

References 

1970s births
Living people
British classical violinists
Musicians from London